Bình Thạnh is a district of Ho Chi Minh City in Vietnam. , the district had a population of 490,618 and a total area of 21 km2.

The name of the district was formed from the names of two wards in the old Gò Vấp district, Bình Hòa and Thạnh Mỹ Tây. In 1976, those two wards were removed from Gò Vấp District to create Bình Thạnh District.

Administrative division
Bình Thạnh is divided into 20 wards. They are wards 1, 2, 3, 5, 6, 7, 11, 12, 13, 14, 15, 17, 19, 21, 22, 24, 25, 26, 27 and 28. Wards 4, 8, 9, 10, 16, 18, 20 and 23 have previously been dissolved and merged into other wards.

Geographical location

Bình Thạnh District borders the city of Thủ Đức to the east, Phú Nhuận district to the west, District 1 to the south, Gò Vấp district and District 12 to the north.

Bình Quới Tourist Village is located on the Thanh Đa Peninsula on the Saigon River.

References 

Districts of Ho Chi Minh City